Bummerville is an unincorporated community in Calaveras County, California, about 1 mile east of West Point. It has frequently been noted on lists of unusual place names.

Bummerville was known historically for its gold and tungsten mining operations.

References

Unincorporated communities in California
Unincorporated communities in Calaveras County, California